In number theory, Bertrand's postulate is a theorem stating that for any integer , there always exists at least one prime number  with 

A less restrictive formulation is: for every , there is always at least one prime  such that 

Another formulation, where  is the -th prime, is: for 

This statement was first conjectured in 1845 by Joseph Bertrand (1822–1900). Bertrand himself verified his statement for all integers .

His conjecture was completely proved by Chebyshev (1821–1894) in 1852 and so the postulate is also called the Bertrand–Chebyshev theorem or Chebyshev's theorem.
, for all .

Prime number theorem 

The prime number theorem (PNT) implies that the number of primes up to x is roughly x/ln(x), so if we replace x with 2x then we see the number of primes up to 2x is asymptotically twice the number of primes up to x (the terms ln(2x) and ln(x) are asymptotically equivalent).  Therefore, the number of primes between n and 2n is roughly n/ln(n) when n is large, and so in particular there are many more primes in this interval than are guaranteed by Bertrand's postulate.  So Bertrand's postulate is comparatively weaker than the PNT.   But PNT is a deep theorem, while Bertrand's Postulate can be stated more memorably and proved more easily, and also makes precise claims about what happens for small values of n. (In addition, Chebyshev's theorem was proved before the PNT and so has historical interest.)

The similar and still unsolved Legendre's conjecture asks whether for every n ≥ 1, there is a prime p such that n2 < p < (n + 1)2. Again we expect that there will be not just one but many primes between n2  and (n + 1)2, but in this case the PNT doesn't help: the number of primes up to x2 is asymptotic to x2/ln(x2) while the number of primes up to (x + 1)2 is asymptotic to (x + 1)2/ln((x + 1)2), which is asymptotic to the estimate on primes up to x2.  So unlike the previous case of x and 2x we don't get a proof of Legendre's conjecture even for all large n.   Error estimates on the PNT are not (indeed, cannot be) sufficient to prove the existence of even one prime in this interval.

Generalizations 

In 1919, Ramanujan (1887–1920) used properties of the Gamma function to give a simpler proof than  Chebyshev's. His short paper included a generalization of the postulate, from which would later arise the concept of Ramanujan primes. Further generalizations of Ramanujan primes have also been discovered; for instance, there is a proof that

with pk the kth prime and Rn the nth Ramanujan prime.

Other generalizations of Bertrand's postulate have been obtained using elementary methods. (In the following, n runs through the set of positive integers.) In 2006, M. El Bachraoui proved that there exists a prime between 2n and 3n.  In 1973, Denis Hanson proved that there exists a prime between 3n and 4n. Furthermore, in 2011, Andy Loo proved that as n tends to infinity, the number of primes between 3n and 4n also goes to infinity, thereby generalizing Erdős' and Ramanujan's results (see the section on Erdős' theorems below).  The first result is obtained with elementary methods. The second one is based on analytic bounds for the factorial function.

Sylvester's theorem 

Bertrand's postulate was proposed for applications to permutation groups. Sylvester (1814–1897) generalized the weaker statement with the statement: the product of k consecutive integers greater than k is divisible by a prime greater than k. Bertrand's (weaker) postulate follows from this by taking k = n, and considering the k numbers n + 1, n + 2, up to and including n + k = 2n, where n > 1. According to Sylvester's generalization, one of these numbers has a prime factor greater than k. Since all these numbers are less than 2(k + 1), the number with a prime factor greater than k has only one prime factor, and thus is a prime. Note that 2n is not prime, and thus indeed we now know there exists a prime p with n < p < 2n.

Erdős's theorems 

In 1932, Erdős (1913–1996) also published a simpler proof using binomial coefficients and the Chebyshev function θ, defined as:

where p ≤ x runs over primes. See proof of Bertrand's postulate for the details.

Erdős proved in 1934 that for any positive integer k, there is a natural number N such that for all n > N, there are at least k primes between n and 2n. An equivalent statement had been proved in 1919 by Ramanujan (see Ramanujan prime).

Better results 

It follows from the prime number theorem that for any real  there is a  such that for all  there is a prime  such that . It can be shown, for instance, that

which implies that  goes to infinity (and, in particular, is greater than 1 for sufficiently large ).

Non-asymptotic bounds have also been proved.

,

In 2010 Pierre Dusart proved that for  there is at least one prime  in the interval .

In 2016, Pierre Dusart improved his result from 2010, showing (Proposition 5.4) that if , there is at least one prime  in the interval .

Baker, Harman and Pintz proved that there is a prime in the interval  for all sufficiently large .

Dudek also proved that the Riemann hypothesis implies that for all  there is a prime  satisfying
.

Consequences
The sequence of primes, along with 1, is a complete sequence; any positive integer can be written as a sum of primes (and 1) using each at most once.
The only harmonic number that is an integer is the number 1.

See also 
 Oppermann's conjecture
 Prime gap
 Proof of Bertrand's postulate

Notes

Bibliography
 
 
 Chris Caldwell, Bertrand's postulate at Prime Pages glossary.

External links
 
 A proof of the weak version in the Mizar system: http://mizar.org/version/current/html/nat_4.html#T56
Bertrand's postulate − A proof of the weak version at www.dimostriamogoldbach.it/en/

Theorems about prime numbers
Mathematical theorems
Theorems in algebra
Number theory
Prime numbers